Krasny Kavkaz (from Russian: "Красный Кавказ" – "Red Caucasus") was a cruiser of the Soviet Navy that began construction during World War I, but was still incomplete during the Russian Revolution. Her design was heavily modified by the Soviets and she was completed in 1932. During World War II she supported Soviet troops during the siege of Odessa, siege of Sevastopol, and the Kerch–Feodosiya operation in the winter of 1941–42. She was awarded the Guards title on 3 April 1942. She was reclassified as a training ship in May 1947 before being expended as a target in 1952.

Service history

Construction was abandoned in 1917 during the October Revolution when the ship was 63% complete. In the second half of 1918, the Marine Department of Hetman Pavlo Skoropadskyi was engaged in completion of ship. On 25 January 1919, the ship was formally renamed in "Hetman Petro Doroshenko", but Mykolaiv was captured shortly afterward by the Entente. The hull was relatively undamaged and the Soviets decided to finish the ship to a modified design. She was renamed Krasny Kavkaz on 14 December 1926, and completed to a modernized design, being commissioned on 25 January 1932.
 
Krasny Kavkaz was initially intended to accommodate eight  guns in four twin turrets, but this was impossible given her small and lightly constructed hull. Three twin turrets mounting the new 57-caliber  B-1-K gun under development also proved impracticable and the Soviets had to settle for four MK-1-180 single 180 mm gun turrets, two at each end. Her superstructure was massively revised to accommodate these turrets and all of the original casemated B7 Pattern 1913 guns were removed. As completed her secondary armament was only four 30-caliber 76.2 mm Lender AA guns mounted between her funnels. Her original internal torpedo tubes were replaced by four triple  torpedo mounts mounted on each side of the main deck abaft the forecastle break. She was given an aircraft-handling crane, but a catapult wasn't installed aft of her rear funnel until 1935 when a Heinkel catapult was imported from Germany. She was also fitted for mine rails with a capacity of up to 120 mines.

The light cruiser  collided with her in May 1932, shortly after her commissioning, and badly damaged her bow. In 1933 she made port visits in Turkey, Greece and Italy.

She was refitted before Operation Barbarossa, probably about 1940, her catapult was removed, and her anti-aircraft armament was greatly increased. Her four 76.2 mm Lender AA guns were exchanged for four Italian Minizini twin gun  47 caliber guns and she received four single mounts for the semi-automatic  34-K guns as well as six  AA machine guns. Two single mounts for 34-K guns were also fitted, one on each side of the quarterdeck just aft of the rearmost main gun turret. Some of these guns may have been received earlier, the sources are unclear. While under repair at Poti in late 1942 she landed her aft pair of torpedo tubes and received two more Minizini mounts salvaged from the sunken cruiser . Ten single mounts for the naval version of the 37 mm AA gun was also fitted. By 1944 she was also carrying one quadruple Vickers .50 machine gun MK III mount on top of each of her superfiring main gun turrets and she may have been using Oerlikon 20 mm cannon.

World War II
Krasny Kavkaz, in company with the cruisers Chervona Ukraina, Komintern and a number of destroyers, laid down a defensive mine barrage protecting the Black Sea Fleet base at Sevastopol on 22 June. She provided gunfire support to Soviet forces defending Odessa and escorted convoys bringing the 157th Rifle Division into Odessa during the month of September 1941. She also transported one battalion of the 3rd Marine Regiment from Sevastopol in a successful amphibious assault behind Romanian lines to destroy Romanian coastal batteries near Fontanka and Dofinovka. She escorted convoys from 3–6 October that evacuated the 157th Rifle Division from Odessa to Sevastopol and escorted the final evacuation convoy during the night of 15–16 October. During the siege of Sevastopol she provided gunfire support and evacuated cut-off troops from elsewhere in the Crimea into Sevastopol and brought in reinforcements from Caucasian ports. She helped to transport the 388th Rifle Division from Novorossiysk and Tuapse to Sevastopol between 7 and 13 December and the 354th Rifle Division between 21 and 22 December, bombarding German positions in the interim.

During the Kerch–Feodosiya operation, Krasny Kavkaz sailed into the harbor of Feodosiya on 29 December 1941 and disembarked reinforcements and provided gunfire support for Soviet troops already ashore. She was hit seventeen times by Axis artillery and mortar fire in retaliation. On 1 and 3 January she ferried supplies and reinforcements for the Soviet bridgehead on the Kerch Peninsula. On the return voyage she was severely damaged by German Junkers Ju 87 Stuka dive-bombers from II./StG 77. She made it to Novorossiysk, escorted by the destroyer , where she was patched up enough to make to Poti where more permanent repairs could be made. These took until October 1942 and the opportunity was taken to reinforce her anti-aircraft armament.

She was awarded the Guards title on 3 April in recognition of her performance. Between 20 and 23 October, Krasny Kavkaz, her half-sister , and three destroyers ferried 12,600 men of the 8th, 9th and 10th Guards Rifle Brigades from Poti to Tuapse to reinforce the defenses there. On the night of 4 February 1943 the Soviets made a series of amphibious landings to the west of Novorossiysk, behind German lines. Krasny Krym, Krasny Kavkaz, and three destroyers provided fire support for the main landing, but the Soviet troops there were wiped out by 6 February, although one secondary landing was successful. The loss of three destroyers attempting to interdict the German evacuation of the Taman Bridgehead on 6 October 1943 caused Stalin to forbid the deployment of large naval units without his express permission and this meant the end of Krasny Kavkazs active participation in the war.

Post-war history
Little is known about her activities after the end of the war other than she was redesignated as a training ship on 12 May 1947. Krasny Kavkaz was assigned as a target ship for testing of KS-1 Kometa (AS-1 Kennel) anti-shipping missile in 1951. She was sunk on 21 November 1952 rather unexpectedly with a first single hit of warhead-equipped missile, splitting in two and sinking in less than 3 minutes.

Notes

References

External links

Ship's history (in Russian)
Cruiser "Krasny Kavkaz" from Black Sea fleet (in Russian, with photos)
– article in Russian from Encyclopedia of Ships

Admiral Nakhimov-class cruisers
Ships built at the Black Sea Shipyard
1916 ships
World War II cruisers of the Soviet Union
Ships sunk as targets
Maritime incidents in January 1942
Maritime incidents in 1952
Ships built in the Russian Empire